Jordi Calafat (born 27 June 1968) is a Spanish sailor and Olympic champion. He won a gold medal in the 470 Class at the 1992 Summer Olympics in Barcelona, together with Kiko Sánchez.

He joined Alinghi and helped them prepare for the 2007 America's Cup.

References

External links

1968 births
Living people
Spanish male sailors (sport)
Olympic sailors of Spain
Sailors at the 1992 Summer Olympics – 470
Sailors at the 1996 Summer Olympics – 470
Olympic gold medalists for Spain
Olympic medalists in sailing
Optimist class world champions
Medalists at the 1992 Summer Olympics
Alinghi sailors
World champions in sailing for Spain
470 class world champions
20th-century Spanish people